Juventino Kestering (São Ludgero, 19 May 1946 – Rondonópolis, 28 March 2021) was a Brazilian Roman Catholic bishop.

Kestering was born in São Ludgero and was ordained to the priesthood in 1973. He served as bishop of the Roman Catholic Diocese of Rondonópolis-Guiratinga, Brazil from 2014 until his death on 28 March 2021 from COVID-19 in Rondonópolis during the COVID-19 pandemic in Brazil.

Notes

1946 births
2021 deaths
21st-century Roman Catholic bishops in Brazil
Deaths from the COVID-19 pandemic in Mato Grosso
Roman Catholic bishops of Rondonópolis-Guiratinga